The World Snooker Tour (WST) is the main professional snooker tour, consisting of approximately 128 players competing on a circuit of up to 28 tournaments each season. The World Snooker Tour is administered by World Snooker Ltd, the commercial arm of professional snooker, which introduced the World Snooker Tour name, logo, and revised website as part of a 2020 rebranding. The principal stakeholder in World Snooker Ltd is Matchroom Sport, which owns 51 percent of the company; the sport's governing body, the World Professional Billiards and Snooker Association (WPBSA), owns 26 percent. To compete on the World Snooker Tour, players must be WPBSA members.

Background 
The current incarnation of the World Snooker Tour was created in the early 1970s when the WPBSA took over the running of the professional game. At the time of the takeover, in 1971, there were only a handful of professional events to play in, but further events were gradually added throughout the 1970s, and by the end of the decade there were over twenty events on the calendar and snooker was a regular televised fixture. This period in the professional game has come to be known as the "modern era"; it is generally accepted to date from 1969 (when the BBC commissioned Pot Black and the knock-out format that is used by the modern-day World Snooker Championship was introduced) to the present day. 

Historically a player just needed to become a professional member of the governing body to participate in events, which was attained by formal invitation by an existing current member, and this system was eventually replaced by the Pro-Ticket series.  The game went open for the 1991–92 season, whereby anyone could apply for professional membership and enter the tournaments. Due to over-subscription, a two-tiered tour structure was adopted for the 1997–98 season: the primary tour—officially now known as the World Snooker Tour but previously known (and still commonly referred to) as the Main Tour—with a limited membership, and a secondary professional tour was established for the rest of the professional membership.

Structure 

The World Snooker Tour consists of ranking tournaments which contribute to a player's ranking, and invitational events which do not.  All players on the tour can enter a ranking event, whereas the entry criteria for an invitational event is often set by the sponsor or broadcaster, and usually excludes many players on the tour. Ranking tournaments are often played in two stages—a qualification stage and the main draw, usually at different locations. The main draw is most likely to be held at a prestigious venue where audiences can purchase a ticket and watch the players compete. Typically only the main draw is televised, and therefore often carries considerably higher prize money than the qualifiers. Players traditionally come into ranking events in different rounds based on their world ranking, and the top players in the sport—often the top 16 ranked players—are usually seeded through to the venue stage and do not have to play a qualification match; however, from the 2013–14 season the circuit began to transition to a flat format structure, with all the players starting in the first round. Some tournaments also have an amateur leg that makes it possible for non-members to enter WPBSA events.

Starting from the 2021-22 snooker season, the tour began to transition some of its events back to a seeded format using qualifying rounds. The Home Nations Series was the first set of events to follow this change, where the first round was played as a qualifying round for all non-Top 16 players, with those in the Top 16 — plus local nation wildcards — having their matches held over to the final venue. The UK Championship followed suit from the 2022 edition, which effectively turned the tournament into a near-identical copy of the World Snooker Championship, with the exception being frame length. While some of these changes have been criticised by lower ranked players [due to qualifiers often being played without crowds and in cubicles, a reminder to some of the pre-Barry Hearn era], others have praised them, especially the format change for the UK Championship which reverted the tournament to the prestige that it had before the flat-128 draw was imposed upon it.

Qualification 
To compete on the World Snooker Tour as a professional player, a player must qualify for it. At the end of each season, a pre-determined number of players are relegated from the tour based on their performance in ranking tournaments and on the secondary tour, making way for new professionals to join the tour. There are several qualification routes for the tour: a player can gain qualification via the various events organised by the WPBSA itself or affiliate organisations, and a limited number of places are usually made available to players at the discretion of the governing body.

History 
Following the creation of the World Snooker Tour in the 1997–98 season, the top ranked professionals qualified automatically for places while the rest of the membership had to qualify for places through a series of qualifying schools. The qualifying schools were only held the once, and thereafter the main qualification route was via the secondary professional tour. Following the scrapping of the secondary tour, the promotion places were then allocated to the International Open Series (PIOS)—an amateur open tour organised by Pontins—for the 2005–06 season. The amateur status of the event meant that players who had been relegated from the Main Tour and wished to compete on PIOS had to relinquish their professional membership. This had an unpopular side effect, since if players relinquished professional membership they would be unable to enter the World Snooker Championship, which was previously open to all professional members including those who do not compete on the Main Tour. Another issue was that players could not compete on PIOS while competing on the Main Tour, meaning that they were unable safeguard their membership on the Main Tour by immediately re-qualifying via PIOS, effectively keeping them out of professional competition for a whole season should they drop off the tour. Even though PIOS was a competition in its own right, it primarily served as a Main Tour qualification route, and anticipating the streamlining of tour qualification for the 2011–12 season this unpopular contest was discontinued after the 2009–10 season.

Q School 

The Q School was established in an attempt to streamline the qualification process for the World Snooker Tour, and is more or less a replacement for PIOS. A series of play-offs are run through to the quarter-final stages only. Players pay a fixed entry fee to enter all the play-off events, and there is no prize money. Each player who wins a quarter-final game qualifies for a two-year tour card on the World Snooker Tour. All the players that have entered the event compete in the first play-off, and those that are not successful are automatically entered into the next play-off and so on.

There are some important differences between the Q School and PIOS. Q School is purely a qualification process whereas PIOS was a tournament series in its own right. Q School is conducted in a limited time period of two to three weeks in May, during the interlude between seasons, while PIOS events were played over the course of the season. Another important distinction from PIOS is that Q-School is open to everyone, and players who have just been relegated from the World Snooker Tour are eligible to enter and if successful immediately regain their places on the tour.

Those who do not manage to qualify for the World Snooker Tour may still be entered into professional tournaments using a Q School top-up list, known as the Order of Merit. This list ranks the amateur players by their performance during the play-offs: should a tournament not consist of 128 World Snooker Tour players for any reason (such as the tournaments that ran through the 2020–21 season because of the COVID-19 pandemic), the highest ranked players on the top-up list will be invited to play in professional tournaments as amateurs. In this vein, players are encouraged to perform well, because they may still feature in World Snooker Tour events and thus have television exposure if they manage to reach the televised stages of an event that they have entered.

Other qualification routes 
Typically, a small number of players who compete on the professional secondary tour will graduate to the World Snooker Tour, and World Snooker will usually offer a small number of invitational tour cards to players who have been relegated from the tour. There are several routes available to amateurs and they involve competitions provided through various amateur governing bodies. The two main ones beyond Q School are the European Billiards and Snooker Association (EBSA) Qualifying Tour and the Chinese Billiards and Snooker Association (CBSA) China Tour. The EBSA also nominates their amateur and junior champions.

Beginning in 2022, the winner of the World Women's Snooker Championship is guaranteed a place on the World Snooker Tour. If the winner is already on the tour, a place will go to the next highest-ranked player in the World Women's Snooker rankings.

Current criteria 

The players who retain their place on the tour are only guaranteed a place for one further season, while all other players—including those that requalify—are awarded a two-year tour card.

Secondary professional tour 

A secondary tour was first established in the 1994–95 season; comprising six tournaments, the WPBSA Minor Tour was open to all professionals, but only ran for one season. The concept was revived in the 1997–98 season in the form of the UK Tour, following the adoption of a two-tier tour structure. Unlike the Main Tour which had restricted membership, the UK Tour was initially open to all professional members, even those competing on the Main Tour—although members of the Main Tour were prohibited from entering from the 1999–2000 season. It was rebranded the Challenge Tour from the 2000–01 season, and open to all players not on the Main Tour and amateurs. From the 2001–02 season, the Challenge Tour had a restricted membership and offered exclusive professional competition to a limited number of professionals that were not members of the Main Tour, and the Open Tour was established which was open to all players—including players on the Main and Challenge tours. The WPBSA operated the three level circuit until the end of the 2002–03 season when it split with the English Association of Snooker and Billiards (EASB). Since the Open Tour fell under the control of the EASB, which is an amateur governing body, the Open Tour took on amateur status and professional players were no longer eligible to enter. The Challenge Tour was axed upon completion of the 2004–05 season, leaving the restricted Main Tour as the only professional competition provided by the WPBSA. There was another attempt to establish a secondary tour in the 2009–10 season, with the introduction of the Pro Challenge Series. Only four of the planned seven events were played before the series was axed due to low player participation; one of the criticisms of the event was that it offered no ranking points which discouraged participation.

The 2010–11 season saw the introduction of the Players Tour Championship (PTC), a series of minor-ranking tournaments that were open to the entire professional membership. The PTC events also included an amateur leg, effectively making it an open tour. They also counted towards the rankings for professionals on the Main Tour, and any player who finished in the top 8 of the PTC Order of Merit was guaranteed a tour card for the following season. The PTC was discontinued at the end of the 2015–16 season, just leaving the Main Tour as the only professional tour.

The Challenge Tour was revived for the 2018–19 season. The tour consists of ten events with a 72-player field, drawing the top 64 players from the Q School Order of Merit who did not qualify for the Main Tour, in addition to a maximum of eight wildcards. It also ran during the 2019–20 season, but was axed during the 2020–21 season during a truncated season played largely behind closed doors due to the COVID-19 pandemic. The tour was revived again for the 2021–22 season under the new name of the Q Tour.

References

Bibliography

External links

Snooker tours and series